Unnikrishnan B (born 14 August 1970) is an Indian film director, screenwriter, distributor and exhibitor who works in the Malayalam film industry.

Early life
Unnikrishnan. B. was born on 14 August 1970 in Pathanamthitta district in Kerala, India.

Career
He began his film career in 1999 by writing the screenplay of Jalamarmaram directed by T. K. Rajeev Kumar, which won the Kerala State Film Award for Best Screenplay that year. The film dealt with the politics of water and environmentalism. In 2000, his screenplay Cover Story directed by G. S. Vijayan was released. It was a box office failure. He was the screenwriter of the thriller Black and White, a television serial telecast in Asianet in 2004, which won two Kerala State Television Awards. The serial was directed by Viji Thampi. in 2004, he wrote and directed a telefilm titled Antharangal, which won the Kerala state television award for the best telefilm.  In 2005, he wrote, produced and directed a telefilm, Annum Mazhayayirunnu which was aired by Amrita TV. The Hindu wrote "The suspense that is maintained throughout the short movie, despite it being set in a domestic, sylvan setting, goes to the credit of the carefully crafted script". The telefilm won six Kerala State Television Awards, including Best Telefilm and Best screenplay for Unnikrishnan.

He scripted Shaji Kailas-directorial action film Shivam in 2002 and the thriller film The Tiger in 2005, the latter starring Suresh Gopi was successful. He made his feature film directorial debut in 2006 with the action film Smart City. His second directorial Madampi starring Mohanlal was a blockbuster . Unlike his previous films, Madampi was a family drama that told the story of a money lender in a village. In 2009, he scripted and directed the action police story I. G. – Inspector General starring Suresh Gopi. The film talked issues like terrorism and communal politics. In the same year, he wrote and directed the segment Aviramam in the anthology film Kerala Cafe. In 2010, he scripted and directed the political satire Pramani starring Mammootty as a corrupt panchayat president, which was a box office failure. 

His directorial crime thriller Grandmaster released in 2012 was written by himself starring Mohanlal as a loner cop who is challenged to investigate a crime. Not only that it was a financial success, but it showed Mohanlal in a totally different look and style. Grandmaster was the first Malayalam film produced by UTV and it is also the first Malayalam film to be released in Netflix, apart from its theatrical release. It was followed by I Love Me, a romantic thriller written by Sethu, that revolves around a group of youngsters. In 2015, he wrote and directed the heist film Mr. Fraud, starring Mohanlal, which was a commercial failure. 

Unnikrishnan forayed into production and distribution with his company, RD Illuminations, which acquired and released the Malayalam dubbed versions of Sarrainodu (2016), Fidaa (2017), DJ: Duvvada Jagannadham (2017), and Bhaagamathie (2018). He collaborated with Mohanlal, in 2017, for the crime thriller, Villain. With the film, he introduced Vishal into Malayalam cinema. It was also the first Indian film to be completely shot in 8K resolution. After that, he co-produced and distributed the action thriller, Swathandriam Ardharathriyil (2018). It was produced by B. C. Joshy, Lijo Jose Pellissery, and Chemban Vinod Jose. It was a huge success at the box-office. In 2019, he wrote and directed the first Malayalam film produced by Viacom18 Motion Pictures, Kodathi Samaksham Balan Vakeel.It was a commercial success. In 2022. he collaborated with Mohanlal, for the fifth time, with Neyyattinkara Gopante Aaraattu written by Udaykrishna. However, it was critically panned by both the critics and audience, alike and box-office failure. In 2023, he collaborated with Mammootty, for a second time with Christopher written by Udaykrishna, it received mixed to positive reviews from critics and audiences.

Other work
He is the general secretary of Film Employees Federation of Kerala (FEFKA) since 2008, he was re-elected to the position three times2010, 2013 and 2017. In 2014, he was elected as the general secretary of All India Film Employees Confederation (AIFEC). He is a member in the advisory committee of Cine Workers' Welfare Board and director of Saamskaarika Kshemanidhi in Kerala. In 2016, he opened the multi-cuisine restaurant named Grandmaster's Kitchen in Palayam, Thiruvananthapuram, the restaurant was named after his film Grandmaster. He owns the film distribution company RD Illuminations, that debuted in 2016 by releasing Yodhavu in Kerala. He was the Managing Director of the film post-production studio Vismayas Max and also the multiplex Aries Plex SL Cinemas, a Double-4K 64-channel Dolby Atmos theatre in Thiruvananthapuram. It is the first theatre with Double-4K facility in South India.

Filmography

Accolades
Kerala State Film Awards
 1999: Best Screenplay – Jalamarmaram

Kerala State Television Awards
 2003: Best telefilm – Antharangal
 2005: Best Telefilm – Annum Mazhayayirunnu
 2005: Best Screenplay – Annum Mazhayayirunnu

References

External links
 

Living people
1970 births
People from Pathanamthitta
Indian male screenwriters
Malayalam screenwriters
Malayalam film directors
Screenwriters from Kerala
Mahatma Gandhi University, Kerala alumni
21st-century Indian film directors
CMS College Kottayam alumni
Film directors from Kerala
Filmmaking pioneers